The 2008 Conference USA men's basketball tournament was won by Memphis. By winning the tournament, Memphis received the conference's automatic bid to the NCAA tournament. It took place March 12–15, 2008, at the FedExForum in Memphis, Tennessee. However, the NCAA vacated Memphis' standings after Derrick Rose was found ineligible.

2008 Conference USA tournament

Asterisk denotes game ended in overtime.

References

Conference USA men's basketball tournament
Tournament
Conference USA men's basketball tournament
Conference USA men's basketball tournament